Phoniscus is a genus of vesper bat in the family Vespertilionidae. It contains the following species:
 Dubious trumpet-eared bat (Phoniscus aerosa)
 Groove-toothed bat (Phoniscus atrox)
 Peters's trumpet-eared bat (Phoniscus jagorii)
 Golden-tipped bat (Phoniscus papuensis)

References

 
Bat genera
Taxa named by Gerrit Smith Miller Jr.
Taxonomy articles created by Polbot